Anthony Barker may refer to:

Anthony Barker (priest) (died 1551), Canon of Windsor
Sir Anthony Barker (MP) (  1557/8–1630), English politician, MP for Reading in 1621
Anthony Raine Barker (1880–1963), British artist
Tony Barker (born 1968), American football linebacker